Crystallography is the experimental science of determining the arrangement of atoms in crystalline solids. Crystallography is a fundamental subject in the fields of materials science and solid-state physics (condensed matter physics). The word "crystallography" is derived from the Greek word κρύσταλλος (krystallos) "clear ice, rock-crystal", with its meaning extending to all solids with some degree of transparency, and γράφειν (graphein) "to write". In July 2012, the United Nations recognised the importance of the science of crystallography by proclaiming that 2014 would be the International Year of Crystallography.

Before the development of X-ray diffraction crystallography (see below), the study of crystals was based on physical measurements of their geometry using a goniometer. This involved measuring the angles of crystal faces relative to each other and to theoretical reference axes (crystallographic axes), and establishing the symmetry of the crystal in question. The position in 3D space of each crystal face is plotted on a stereographic net such as a Wulff net or Lambert net. The pole to each face is plotted on the net. Each point is labelled with its Miller index. The final plot allows the symmetry of the crystal to be established.

Crystallographic methods now depend on analysis of the diffraction patterns of a sample targeted by a beam of some type. X-rays are most commonly used; other beams used include electrons or neutrons. Crystallographers often explicitly state the type of beam used, as in the terms X-ray crystallography, neutron diffraction and electron diffraction. These three types of radiation interact with the specimen in different ways.
 X-rays interact with the spatial distribution of electrons in the sample.
 Electrons are charged particles and therefore interact with the total charge distribution of both the atomic nuclei and the electrons of the sample.
 Neutrons are scattered by the atomic nuclei through the strong nuclear forces, but in addition, the magnetic moment of neutrons is non-zero. They are therefore also scattered by magnetic fields. When neutrons are scattered from hydrogen-containing materials, they produce diffraction patterns with high noise levels. However, the material can sometimes be treated to substitute deuterium for hydrogen. Because of these different forms of interaction, the three types of radiation are suitable for different crystallographic studies.

Theory

With conventional imaging techniques such as optical microscopy, obtaining an image of a small object requires collecting light with a magnifying lens. The resolution of any optical system is limited by the diffraction-limit of light, which depends on its wavelength. Thus, the overall clarity of resulting crystallographic electron density maps is highly dependent upon the resolution of the diffraction data, which can be categorized as: low, medium, high and atomic. For example,  visible light has a wavelength of about 4000 to 7000 ångström, which is three orders of magnitude longer than the length of typical atomic bonds and atoms themselves (about 1 to 2 Å). Therefore, a conventional optical microscope cannot resolve the spatial arrangement of atoms in a crystal. To do so, we would need radiation with much shorter wavelengths, such as X-ray or neutron beams.

Unfortunately, focusing X-rays with conventional optical lens can be a challenge. Scientists have had some success focusing X-rays with microscopic Fresnel zone plates made from gold, and by critical-angle reflection inside long tapered capillaries. Diffracted X-ray or neutron beams cannot be focused to produce images, so the sample structure must be reconstructed from the diffraction pattern.

Diffraction patterns arise from the constructive interference of incident radiation (x-rays, electrons, neutrons), scattered by the periodic, repeating features of the sample.  Because of their highly ordered and repetitive atomic structure (Bravais lattice), crystals diffract x-rays in a coherent manner, also referred to as Bragg's reflection.

Notation

 Coordinates in square brackets such as [100] denote a direction vector (in real space).
 Coordinates in angle brackets or chevrons such as <100> denote a family of directions which are related by symmetry operations. In the cubic crystal system for example, <100> would mean [100], [010], [001] or the negative of any of those directions.
 Miller indices in parentheses such as (100) denote a plane of the crystal structure, and regular repetitions of that plane with a particular spacing. In the cubic system, the normal to the (hkl) plane is the direction [hkl], but in lower-symmetry cases, the normal to (hkl) is not parallel to [hkl].
 Indices in curly brackets or braces such as {100} denote a family of planes and their normals. In cubic materials the symmetry makes them equivalent, just as the way angle brackets denote a family of directions. In non-cubic materials, <hkl> is not necessarily perpendicular to {hkl}.

Techniques
Some materials that have been analyzed crystallographically, such as proteins, do not occur naturally as crystals. Typically, such molecules are placed in solution and allowed to slowly crystallize through vapor diffusion. A drop of solution containing the molecule, buffer, and precipitants is sealed in a container with a reservoir containing a hygroscopic solution. Water in the drop diffuses to the reservoir, slowly increasing the concentration and allowing a crystal to form. If the concentration were to rise more quickly, the molecule would simply precipitate out of solution, resulting in disorderly granules rather than an orderly and usable crystal.

Once a crystal is obtained, data can be collected using a beam of radiation. Although many universities that engage in crystallographic research have their own X-ray producing equipment, synchrotrons are often used as X-ray sources, because of the purer and more complete patterns such sources can generate. Synchrotron sources also have a much higher intensity of X-ray beams, so data collection takes a fraction of the time normally necessary at weaker sources. Complementary neutron crystallography techniques are used to identify the positions of hydrogen atoms, since X-rays only interact very weakly with light elements such as hydrogen.

Producing an image from a diffraction pattern requires sophisticated mathematics and often an iterative process of modelling and refinement. In this process, the mathematically predicted diffraction patterns of a hypothesized or "model" structure are compared to the actual pattern generated by the crystalline sample. Ideally, researchers make several initial guesses, which through refinement all converge on the same answer. Models are refined until their predicted patterns match to as great a degree as can be achieved without radical revision of the model. This is a painstaking process, made much easier today by computers.

The mathematical methods for the analysis of diffraction data only apply to patterns, which in turn result only when waves diffract from orderly arrays. Hence crystallography applies for the most part only to crystals, or to molecules which can be coaxed to crystallize for the sake of measurement. In spite of this, a certain amount of molecular information can be deduced from patterns that are generated by fibers and powders, which while not as perfect as a solid crystal, may exhibit a degree of order. This level of order can be sufficient to deduce the structure of simple molecules, or to determine the coarse features of more complicated molecules. For example, the double-helical structure of DNA was deduced from an X-ray diffraction pattern that had been generated by a fibrous sample.

Materials science
Crystallography is used by materials scientists to characterize different materials. In single crystals, the effects of the crystalline arrangement of atoms is often easy to see macroscopically because the natural shapes of crystals reflect the atomic structure. In addition, physical properties are often controlled by crystalline defects. The understanding of crystal structures is an important prerequisite for understanding crystallographic defects. Most materials do not occur as a single crystal, but are poly-crystalline in nature (they exist as an aggregate of small crystals with different orientations). As such, powder diffraction techniques, which takes diffraction patterns of polycrystalline samples with a large number of crystals, plays an important role in structural determination.

Other physical properties are also linked to crystallography. For example, the minerals in clay form small, flat, platelike structures. Clay can be easily deformed because the platelike particles can slip along each other in the plane of the plates, yet remain strongly connected in the direction perpendicular to the plates. Such mechanisms can be studied by crystallographic texture measurements.

In another example, iron transforms from a body-centered cubic (bcc) structure called ferrite to a face-centered cubic (fcc) structure called austenite when it is heated. The fcc structure is a close-packed structure unlike the bcc structure; thus the volume of the iron decreases when this transformation occurs.

Crystallography is useful in phase identification. When manufacturing or using a material, it is generally desirable to know what compounds and what phases are present in the material, as their composition, structure and proportions will influence the material's properties. Each phase has a characteristic arrangement of atoms. X-ray or neutron diffraction can be used to identify which structures are present in the material, and thus which compounds are present. Crystallography covers the enumeration of the symmetry patterns which can be formed by atoms in a crystal and for this reason is related to group theory.

Biology
X-ray crystallography is the primary method for determining the molecular conformations of biological macromolecules, particularly protein and nucleic acids such as DNA and RNA. In fact, the double-helical structure of DNA was deduced from crystallographic data. The first crystal structure of a macromolecule was solved in 1958, a three-dimensional model of the myoglobin molecule obtained by X-ray analysis. The Protein Data Bank (PDB) is a freely accessible repository for the structures of proteins and other biological macromolecules. Computer programs such as RasMol, Pymol or VMD can be used to visualize biological molecular structures.
Neutron crystallography is often used to help refine structures obtained by X-ray methods or to solve a specific bond; the methods are often viewed as complementary, as X-rays are sensitive to electron positions and scatter most strongly off heavy atoms, while neutrons are sensitive to nucleus positions and scatter strongly even off many light isotopes, including hydrogen and deuterium.
Electron crystallography has been used to determine some protein structures, most notably membrane proteins and viral capsids.

Contribution of women to X-ray crystallography 
A number of women were pioneers in X-ray crystallography at a time when they were excluded from most other branches of physical science.

Kathleen Lonsdale was a research student of William Henry Bragg, who with his son Lawrence founded the science of X-ray crystallography at the beginning of the 20th century. She is known for both her experimental and theoretical work. Bragg had 11 women research students out of a total of 18. Kathleen joined his crystallography research team at the Royal Institution in London in 1923, and after getting married and having children, went back to work with Bragg as a researcher. She confirmed the structure of the benzene ring, carried out studies of diamond, was one of the first two women to be elected to the Royal Society in 1945, and in 1949 was appointed the first female tenured professor of chemistry and head of the Department of crystallography at University College London. Kathleen always advocated greater participation of women in science and  said in 1970: "Any country that wants to make full use of all its potential scientists and technologists could do so, but it must not expect to get the women quite so simply as it gets the men.... It is utopian, then, to suggest that any country that really wants married women to return to a scientific career, when her children no longer need her physical presence, should make special arrangements to encourage her to do so?". During this period, Kathleen began a collaboration with William T. Astbury on a set of 230 space group tables which was published in 1924 and became an essential  tool for crystallographers.

In 1932 Dorothy Hodgkin joined the laboratory of the physicist John Desmond Bernal, who was a former student of Bragg, in Cambridge, UK. She and Bernal took the first X-ray photographs of crystalline proteins. Hodgkin also played a role in the foundation of the International Union of Crystallography. She was awarded the Nobel Prize in Chemistry in 1964 for her work using X-ray techniques to study the structures of penicillin, insulin and vitamin B12. Her work on penicillin began in 1942 during the war and on vitamin B12 in 1948. While her group slowly grew, their predominant focus was on the X-ray analysis of natural products. She is the only British woman ever to have won a Nobel Prize in a science subject.

Rosalind Franklin took the X-ray photograph of a DNA fibre that proved key to James Watson and Francis Crick's  discovery of the double helix, for which they both won the Nobel Prize for Physiology or Medicine in 1962. Watson revealed in his autobiographic account of the discovery of the structure of DNA, The Double Helix, that he had used Rosalind's X-ray photograph without her permission. Franklin died of cancer in her 30s, before Watson received the Nobel Prize. Franklin also carried out important structural studies of carbon in coal and graphite, and of plant and animal viruses.

Isabella Karle of the United States Naval Research Laboratory developed an experimental approach to the mathematical theory of crystallography. Her work improved the speed and accuracy of chemical and biomedical analysis. Yet only her husband Jerome shared the 1985 Nobel Prize in Chemistry with Herbert Hauptman, "for outstanding achievements in the development of direct methods for the determination of crystal structures". Other prize-giving bodies have showered Isabella with awards in her own right.

Women have written many textbooks and research papers in the field of X-ray crystallography. For many years Lonsdale edited the International Tables for Crystallography, which provide information on crystal lattices, symmetry, and space groups, as well as mathematical, physical and chemical data on structures. Olga Kennard of the University of Cambridge, founded and ran the Cambridge Crystallographic Data Centre, an internationally recognized source of structural data on small molecules, from 1965 until 1997. Jenny Pickworth Glusker, a British scientist, co-authored Crystal Structure Analysis: A Primer, first published in 1971 and as of 2010 in its third edition. Eleanor Dodson, an Australian-born biologist, who began as Dorothy Hodgkin's technician, was the main instigator behind CCP4, the collaborative computing project that currently shares more than 250 software tools with protein crystallographers worldwide.

Reference literature 
The International Tables for Crystallography is an eight-book series that outlines the standard notations for formatting, describing and testing crystals. The series contains books that covers analysis methods and the mathematical procedures for determining organic structure through x-ray crystallography, electron diffraction, and neutron diffraction. The International tables are focused on procedures, techniques and descriptions and do not list the physical properties of individual crystals themselves. Each book is about 1000 pages and the titles of the books are:

Vol A -  Space Group Symmetry,
Vol A1 - Symmetry Relations Between Space Groups,
Vol B -  Reciprocal Space,
Vol C - Mathematical, Physical, and Chemical Tables,
Vol D - Physical Properties of Crystals,
Vol E - Subperiodic Groups,
Vol F - Crystallography of Biological Macromolecules, and
Vol G - Definition and Exchange of Crystallographic Data.

Notable scientists

See also

 Abnormal grain growth
 Atomic packing factor
 Beevers–Lipson strip
 Condensed matter physics
 Crystal engineering
 Crystal growth
 Crystal optics
 Crystal structure
 Crystallite
 Crystallization processes
 Crystallographic database
 Crystallographic point group
 Crystallographic group
 Dynamical theory of diffraction
 Electron crystallography
 Electron diffraction
 Euclidean plane isometry
 Fixed points of isometry groups in Euclidean space
 Fractional coordinates
 Group action
 International Year of Crystallography
 Laser-heated pedestal growth
 Low-energy electron diffraction
 Materials science
 Metallurgy
 Mineralogy
 Modeling of polymer crystals
 Neutron crystallography
 Neutron diffraction at OPAL
 Neutron diffraction at the ILL
 NMR crystallography
 Permutation group
 Point group
 Precession electron diffraction
 Quantum mineralogy
 Quasicrystal
 Solid state chemistry
 Space group
 Symmetric group
 Timeline of crystallography
 Transmission electron microscopy
 X-ray crystallography
 Lattice constant

References

External links

 American Crystallographic Association
 Learning Crystallography
 Web Course on Crystallography
 Crystallographic Space Groups

 
Chemistry
Condensed matter physics
Instrumental analysis
Materials science
Neutron-related techniques
Synchrotron-related techniques